Northall is a hamlet in the civil parish of Edlesborough, in Buckinghamshire, England, situated halfway between Edlesborough and Billington, Bedfordshire. It has one large Baptist chapel which is still in use and one pub, The Swan.

The village was formerly part of the Ashridge Estate of the Earls and Dukes of Bridgwater. Like nearby Slapton, it has a few very high gabled cottages, with thickly latticed window panes, which are indicative of having been designed by the architect retained by the estate in the 19th century. The hamlet contains some recently built houses, but most houses are predominantly 19th century. A 16th century inn, The Village Green, was recently converted to a private house.

References

Hamlets in Buckinghamshire